John Hamilton Low (29 October 1874 – ?) was a Scottish footballer who played in the Football League for Bolton Wanderers. He had moved south from Scottish club Dundee with teammate Jock Malloch, but their first club Brighton United had financial difficulties and the two men went their separate ways.

References

1874 births
Scottish footballers
Footballers from Dundee
English Football League players
Scottish Football League players
Association football midfielders
Dundee F.C. players
Bolton Wanderers F.C. players
Brighton United F.C. players
Year of death missing